Partizan Midi-Minuit is a French company, which produced videos such as the multi-award-winning Cog television advertisement for the Honda Accord, the 2004 ads for 7-Up, featuring Fido Dido, music video for U2's "Vertigo". and the 2016 film Moonwalkers. The company was founded by Georges Bermann in 1986, exclusively producing music videos. The UK office opened in 1991 and they have since expanded into offices in New York, Los Angeles, the Middle East, Sao Paulo and Berlin. The company is notable for signing Michel Gondry, who helped make the company popular with the release of his Grammy-nominated music video for "Human Behaviour" by Björk in 1993. Several more of Gondry's videos were nominated for a Grammy Award for Best Music Video, although Partizan received its first Grammy in 2005, with "Vertigo" by U2, directed by Alex and Martin. Other directors who've worked with Partizan include Warren Fu, Hiro Murai, Ace Norton, Gil Green, Chris Robinson, Philip Andelman, Chris Applebaum, Saam Farahmand, Kinga Burza, Henry Scholfield, and many more.

External links 
 http://www.partizan.com, official website

References 

Partizan films
Television production companies of France